Carl Leslie Shy (September 13, 1908 – December 17, 1991) was an American basketball player who competed in the 1936 Summer Olympics. He was part of the United States basketball team that won the gold medal. He played in three matches, including the championship. Shy played college basketball at UCLA.

External links
Profile
USA Basketball All-Time Roster

1908 births
1991 deaths
Amateur Athletic Union men's basketball players
American men's basketball players
Basketball players at the 1936 Summer Olympics
Basketball players from Los Angeles
Guards (basketball)
Medalists at the 1936 Summer Olympics
Olympic gold medalists for the United States in basketball
UCLA Bruins men's basketball players
United States men's national basketball team players